Mayali or Manyallaluk Mayali is a dialect of Bininj Kunwok, an Australian Aboriginal language. The Aboriginal people who speak Mayali are the Bininj people, who live primarily in western Arnhem Land. Mayali is spoken primarily in south-west Arnhem Land, particularly around Pine Creek, Katherine and Manyallaluk. Occasionally the term "Mayali" is used to refer to all Bininj Kunwok dialects collectively, however this is not generally accepted usage. Speakers of the Kundjeyhmi dialect of Bininj Kunwok often regard Mayali as similar to, or even the same as, Kundjeyhmi.

References

Further reading 
 , 2 volumes

External links
Bininj Kunwok online dictionary

Kunwok

Gunwinyguan languages
Arnhem Land
Indigenous Australian languages in the Northern Territory